Brad Williams may refer to:

Brad Williams (cricketer) (born 1974), Australian cricketer
Brad Williams (comedian) (born 1984), American comedian and actor who regularly appears on the show Mind of Mencia
Brad Williams (mnemonist) (born c. 1956), one of the only three people in the world with a condition called hyperthymestic syndrome
Brad Williams (puppeteer) (1951–1993), American puppet designer for TV programs and literacy education
Brad Williams (rugby league), Australian rugby league player
Brad Williams (EastEnders), a fictional television character from British soap opera EastEnders
Brad Allen Williams (born 1980), American guitarist, producer, and songwriter/composer
Brad Williams, a fictional television character from American comedy series Happy Endings